JEJ may refer to:
 Jej, Afghanistan
 James Earl Jones (born 1931), American actor
 Johnnie Johnson (RAF officer) (1915–2001), Second World War flying ace
 Jeh Airport, on Ailinglaplap Atoll, Marshall Islands
 Joseph E. Johnston, Confederate general.
 Japana Esperanto-Junularo （日本青年エスペラント連絡会）, Japanese Esperanto-Youth

 Jeong Eun Ji (Korean singer songwriter , Apink )